Stjepan Lončar (born 10 November 1996) is a Bosnian professional footballer who plays as a midfielder for Belgian Pro League club Kortrijk, on loan from Ferencváros, and the Bosnia and Herzegovina national team.

Lončar started his professional career at Široki Brijeg, before joining Rijeka in 2018. Three years later, he moved to Ferencváros, who loaned him to Kortrijk in 2022.

A former youth international for Bosnia and Herzegovina, Lončar made his senior international debut in 2018, earning 11 caps since.

Club career

Early career
Lončar came through Široki Brijeg's youth academy, which he joined in 2003. He made his professional debut against Vitez on 24 July 2016 at the age of 19. On 20 September 2017, he scored his first professional goal against Radnik Bijeljina, which sent his team through in their cup tie.

Rijeka
In June 2018, Lončar signed a three-year deal with Croatian outfit Rijeka. He made his official debut for the team on 3 August against Inter Zaprešić. On 10 February 2019, he scored his first goal for Rijeka against the same opponent. He won his first trophy with the club on 22 May, by beating Dinamo Zagreb in Croatian Cup final.

On 3 March 2021, he played his 100th game for the side against Osijek.

Ferencváros
In July, Lončar was transferred to Hungarian team Ferencváros for an undisclosed fee. He made his competitive debut for the side against Kisvárda on 31 July. On 19 September, he scored his first goal for Ferencváros in Magyar Kupa game against Hatvan. Seven weeks later, he scored his first league goal. He won his first title with the club on 24 April 2022, when they were crowned league champions.

In September 2022, he was sent on a season-long loan to Belgian outfit Kortrijk.

International career
Lončar represented Bosnia and Herzegovina at various youth levels.

In January 2018, he received his first senior call-up, for friendly games against the United States and Mexico. He debuted against the latter on 31 January.

Personal life
Lončar's father Robert was also a professional footballer.

Career statistics

Club

International

Honours
Široki Brijeg
Bosnian Cup: 2016–17

Rijeka
Croatian Cup: 2018–19, 2019–20

Ferencváros
Nemzeti Bajnokság I: 2021–22
Magyar Kupa: 2021–22

References

External links

1996 births
Living people
Sportspeople from Mostar
Croats of Bosnia and Herzegovina
Bosnia and Herzegovina footballers
Bosnia and Herzegovina youth international footballers
Bosnia and Herzegovina under-21 international footballers
Bosnia and Herzegovina international footballers
Bosnia and Herzegovina expatriate footballers
Association football midfielders
NK Široki Brijeg players
HNK Rijeka players
Ferencvárosi TC footballers
K.V. Kortrijk players
Premier League of Bosnia and Herzegovina players
Croatian Football League players
Nemzeti Bajnokság I players
Belgian Pro League players
Expatriate footballers in Croatia
Expatriate footballers in Hungary
Expatriate footballers in Belgium
Bosnia and Herzegovina expatriate sportspeople in Croatia
Bosnia and Herzegovina expatriate sportspeople in Hungary
Bosnia and Herzegovina expatriate sportspeople in Belgium